Mount Xianglu is a mountain near Shaoxing, Zhejiang, China.

History
Its historic name was Mount Kuaiji, formerly romanized as Mount K'uai-chi It was an important site for ancient China's Yue civilization and was legendarily connected with the Xia dynasty's Yu the Great, who was said to have convened a gathering of his nobles there and to have died at the spot during a hunting trip. The mountain continued to preserve the Old Yue language even after its conquest by Qin in 222 BC. It gave its name to the Kuaiji Mountains to its south, as well as China's former Kuaiji Commandery and (by extension) historical names for Suzhou and Shaoxing. It was also the site of the AD 353 Orchid Pavilion Gathering which produced the Lantingji Xu.

The present site of Yu's mausoleum to the north of the peak dates to the 6th century, but sacrifice in his honor has occurred in the area since at least the reign of Shi Huangdi and it featured in Sima Qian's pilgrimage around the historical sites of China prior to his composition of the Records of the Grand Historian.

See also
 Kuaiji Mountains

Notes

External links
 James M. Hargett's ": Guaiji? Guiji? Huiji? Kuaiji? Some Remarks on an Ancient Chinese Place-Name" (Sino-Platonic Papers No. 234)

Mountains of Zhejiang